The Rhineland-Palatinate Landtag is the state diet of the German federal state of Rhineland-Palatinate.
 
Article 79, Section 1 of the Rhineland-Palatinate constitution provides: "The Landtag is the supreme organ of political decision-making, elected by the people. It represents the people, elects the Minister-President and confirms the cabinet, passes the laws and the budget, controls the executive and enunciates the popular will in the conduct of public affairs, in questions of European policy and according to the agreements between the Landtag and the cabinet."

The Landtag consists of 101 members.

The Landtag convenes in the Deutschhaus building, where also the first democratically elected parliament German history had convened, the Rhenish-German national convention of the Mainz Republic. Parts of its administration are located in the old arsenal.

The German flag used in the Landtag is a historical one used during the Hambacher Fest.

Composition
After the elections of March 14, 2021, the composition of the Landtag is as follows:

Political groups in bold support the state's coalition government.
Since 2011 the Webster/Sainte-Laguë method is used for allocating seats in party-list proportional representation.

Presidents of the Landtag
 1947–1948 Jakob Diel, CDU
 1948–1959 August Wolters, CDU
 1959–1971 Otto van Volxem, CDU
 1971–1974 Johannes Baptist Rösler, CDU
 1974–1985 Albrecht Martin, CDU
 1985–1991 Heinz Peter Volkert, CDU
 1991–2006 Christoph Grimm, SPD
 2006–2016 Joachim Mertes, SPD
 since 2016 Hendrik Hering, SPD

See also
List of Members of the Rhineland-Palatinate Landtag

References

Rhineland-Palatinate
Politics of Rhineland-Palatinate